Enrique Perez Colman (Paraná, July 15, 1886, Buenos Aires, August 4, 1957) was a lawyer, journalist, writer, professor and Argentine politician, who served as Minister of the Treasury between 1928 and 1930, during the second presidency of Hipólito Yrigoyen.

Biography

Work as a writer and journalist 
Beside being an Yrigoyenist politician, Enrique Pérez Colman was also a writer and journalist. He is also family of the respected Argentinian writer César Blas Pérez Colman.

In 1912 the Radical Civic Union newspaper La Libertad was founded, result of the enthusiasm of the young radicalist movement; its main editors were Enrique Pérez Colman and the Radical Civic Union Eduardo F. Lemos.

As a journalist, he was Director of El Diario de Paraná (1920-1922), and director of the University Magazine of the National University of the Litoral.

He also wrote several books:

References 

1886 births
1957 deaths
Argentine Ministers of Finance
People from Paraná, Entre Ríos
Radical Civic Union politicians